Cyril Oxley (born 2 May 1905) was an English footballer who played as a midfielder for Liverpool in the Football League. Oxley signed for Liverpool from Chesterfield in 1925. He played 31 matches during the 1925–26 season, in what was to be his only season at the club.

Born in Whitwell, Derbyshire, Oxley was the older brother of fellow footballer and Chesterfield and Sheffield United player Bernard.

References

1905 births
People from Whitwell, Derbyshire
Footballers from Derbyshire
Year of death missing
English footballers
Chesterfield F.C. players
Liverpool F.C. players
English Football League players
Association football midfielders